Baghini (English: The Tigress) is an Indian Bangla film which is based on the life of the Chief Minister of West Bengal Mamata Banerjee. The film was released on 24 May 2019.

Cast
 Ruma Chakraborty - Indira Banarjee
 Falguni Chaterjee
 Pradeep Dhar
 Partha Chakraborty
 Shuvomoy Chaterjee
 Subrata Guho Roy
 Rahul Chakraborty
 Anjan Paul
 Ananya Guho

Production
In 2016, Nehal Dutt has announced that he would direct a film which was based on the life of Mamata Banarjee. Then, it was also announced that Ruma Chakraborty would act as the main character of the film and her character's name would be Indira Banerjee. After filming, the trailer of the film was released on 13 April 2019.

References

Bengali-language Indian films
2010s biographical films
Indian biographical films
Mamata Banerjee
2010s Bengali-language films